Army SOS is one of the leading volunteer organizations helping Ukrainian military personnel during Russian-Ukrainian war since 2014. It is engaged in the manufacture of unmanned aerial vehicles and reconnaissance with their help, the purchase and programming of tablets for the artillery, the supply of vehicles, radio reconnaissance equipment, silencers for weapons and the provision of various other assistance.

History 
The organization was founded in March 2014 by Euromaidan activists: Yurii Kasyanov, Oleksiy Savchenko, Yaroslav Tropinov and Oleksandr Foshchan. With the beginning of the war, they began to help the first battalion of the National Guard, then extended their activities to its second battalion and the "Donbas" and "Peacemaker" battalions, and eventually began to take care of all military formations on the front lines.

As of the beginning of May 2014, more than one million hryvnias were collected, at the beginning of June — 2.5 million, by July — more than 5 million, by August 2014 — more than 10 million, by July 2015 — 20 million, as of July 2016 — 22.5 million, as of July 2017 — 24.9 million. In addition, the organization receives a lot of in-kind aid.

"Army SOS" helps various military formations located in the zone of active hostilities. According to its volunteers, their help was received, in particular, by the 1st and 2nd battalions of the National Guard, the "Aidar", "Artemivsk", "Donbas", "Kyiv-1", "Kyiv-2" and "Peacemaker" battalions. 1st, 24th, 25th, 26th, 80th, 93rd and 95th brigades.

On August 21, 2021, the "SOS Army" team was awarded the non-governmental order "People's Hero of Ukraine".

References 

Volunteering in Ukraine
Charities based in Ukraine
Organizations established in 2014
2014 establishments in Ukraine